The 16th edition of Strade Bianche was held on 5 March 2022. It was the third event of the 2022 UCI World Tour.

Teams
Twenty-two teams participated in the race, seventeen UCI WorldTeams and five UCI ProTeams.

UCI WorldTeams

 
 
 
 
 
 
 
 
 
 
 
 
 
 
 
 
 

UCI ProTeams

Route
It includes  of gravel over eleven sectors.

Result

References

Strade Bianche
Strade Bianche
Strade Bianche
Strade Bianche